Zealandia (pronounced ), also known as  (Māori) or Tasmantis, is an almost entirely submerged mass of continental crust that subsided after breaking away from Gondwanaland 83–79 million years ago. It has been described variously as a submerged continent, continental fragment, and microcontinent. The name and concept for Zealandia was proposed by Bruce Luyendyk in 1995, and satellite imagery shows it to be almost the size of Australia. A 2021 study suggests Zealandia is 1 billion years old, about twice as old as geologists previously thought.

By approximately 23 million years ago, the landmass may have been completely submerged. Today, most of the landmass (94%) remains submerged beneath the Pacific Ocean. New Zealand is the largest part of Zealandia that is above sea level, followed by New Caledonia.

If classified as a microcontinent, Zealandia would be the world's largest microcontinent. Its area is six times the area of Madagascar, the next-largest microcontinent in the world, and more than half the area of the Australian continent. Zealandia is more than twice the size of the largest intraoceanic large igneous province (LIP) in the world, the Ontong Java Plateau (approximately ), and the world's largest island, Greenland. Zealandia is also substantially larger than the Arabian Peninsula, the world's largest peninsula, and the Indian subcontinent. Due to these and other geological considerations, such as crustal thickness and density, some geologists from New Zealand, New Caledonia, and Australia have concluded that Zealandia fulfills all the requirements to be considered a continent rather than a microcontinent or continental fragment. Geologist Nick Mortimer  commented that if it were not for the ocean level, it would have been recognized as such long ago.

Zealandia supports substantial inshore fisheries and contains gas fields, of which the largest known is the New Zealand Maui gas field, near Taranaki. Permits for oil exploration in the Great South Basin were issued in 2007. Offshore mineral resources include ironsands, volcanic massive sulfides and ferromanganese nodule deposits.

Etymology
GNS Science recognises two names for the landmass. In English, the most common name is Zealandia, a Latinate name for New Zealand; the name was coined in the mid-1990s and became established through common use. In the Māori language, the landmass is named , meaning 'the hills, valleys, and plains of Māui'.

Geology

Biogeography 
New Caledonia is at the northern end of the ancient continent, while New Zealand rises at the plate boundary that bisects it. These land masses constitute two outposts of the Antarctic flora, featuring araucarias and podocarps. At Curio Bay, logs of a fossilized forest closely related to modern Kauri and Norfolk pine can be seen that grew on Zealandia approximately 180 million years ago during the Jurassic period, before it split from Gondwana. The trees growing in these forests were buried by volcanic mud flows and gradually replaced by silica to produce the fossils now exposed by the sea.

As sea levels drop during glacial periods, more of Zealandia becomes a terrestrial environment rather than a marine environment. Originally, it was thought that Zealandia had no native land mammal fauna, but the discovery in 2006 of a fossil mammal jaw from the Miocene in the Otago region demonstrates otherwise.

Political divisions 

Population 
 the total human population of Zealandia is approximately 5.4 million people.

  – 5,112,300
  (France) – 268,767
  (Australia) – 1,748
  (Australia) – 382
  Cato Reef (Australia) – 0
  Elizabeth Reef (Australia) – 0
  Middleton Reef (Australia) – 0

See also 

 Australia (continent)
 Exclusive economic zone of New Zealand
 New Zealand Subantarctic Islands

References

External links 
 
 
 
 Zealandia (National Geographic Encyclopedia)
 Is Zealandia a continent?
The missing continent that took 375 years to find, By Zaria Gorvett, 7th February 2021, BBC website.
Earth Has a Hidden 8th Continent, By Tia Ghose published February 17, 2017, livescience website. 

 
Continental fragments
Continents
Geology of New Zealand
Geography of New Caledonia
Geography of Oceania
Geography of the New Zealand seabed